Nisa Donnelly (November 11, 1950 – January 30, 2021) was an American writer. She was most noted for her 1989 novel The Bar Stories: A Novel After All, which won the Lambda Literary Award for Lesbian Fiction at the 2nd Lambda Literary Awards in 1990.

Her second novel, The Love Songs of Phoenix Bay, was published in 1994. She won a second Lambda at the 11th Lambda Literary Awards in the Non-Fiction Anthologies category, as editor of the anthology Mom: Candid Memoirs by Lesbians About the First Woman in Their Life.

She died on January 30, 2021, in Portland, Oregon.

References

1950 births
2021 deaths
20th-century American novelists
American women novelists
Lambda Literary Award for Lesbian Fiction winners
American lesbian writers
American LGBT novelists
20th-century American women writers
21st-century American women writers